The 2017 Pac-12 Conference men's basketball tournament was the postseason men's basketball tournament for the Pac-12 Conference and was played during March 8–11, 2017 at T-Mobile Arena in Paradise, Nevada. The champion, Arizona, received the Pac-12 conference automatic bid to the 2017 NCAA tournament with an 83-80 win over Oregon in the finals.

Seeds
Teams will be seeded by conference record, with ties broken in the following order:
 Record between the tied teams
 Record against the highest-seeded team not involved in the tie, going down through the seedings as necessary
 Higher RPI:
 Head-to-head

Schedule

Bracket
* denotes overtime period

Game statistics

First round

Quarterfinals

Semifinals

Championship

Awards and honors

Hall of Honor
The following former players were inducted into the Pac-12 Conference Men's Basketball Hall of Honor on Friday, March 10, during a ceremony prior to the semifinals of the 2017 Pac-12 Men's Basketball Tournament presented by New York Life.
 
 Bob Elliott (Arizona)
 Tarence Wheeler (Arizona State)
 Jerome Randle (California)
 Chauncey Billups (Colorado)
 Stu Jackson (Oregon)
 Ray Blume (Oregon State)
 Mike Montgomery (Stanford)
 David Greenwood  (UCLA)
 Ralph Vaughn (USC)
 Andre Miller (Utah)
 Quincy Pondexter (Washington)
 Carlos Daniel (Washington State).

Team and tournament leaders

All-Tournament Team

Most Outstanding Player

Tournament notes
Four teams were selected for the 2017 NCAA Division I men's basketball tournament: Arizona, UCLA, Oregon, and USC. 
For the fourth time in conference history, three of the teams had a 3 seed or higher in the NCAA tournament: Arizona earned #2 in the West, UCLA #3 in the South and Oregon #3 in the Midwest. These three teams all reached the Sweet Sixteen of the 2017 NCAA Tournament. Oregon reached the Final Four, and was eliminated in the semi-finals by eventual National Champion North Carolina.
Three Pac-12 teams were selected to participate in the 2017 National Invitation Tournament: Utah, California, and Colorado.

References

See also

2017 Pac-12 Conference women's basketball tournament

Pac-12 Conference men's basketball tournament
2016–17 Pac-12 Conference men's basketball season
Pac-12 Conference men's basketball tournament
21st century in Las Vegas
Basketball competitions in the Las Vegas Valley
College basketball tournaments in Nevada
College sports tournaments in Nevada